Our Two Skins is the second studio album by Australian singer-songwriter Gordi, released on 26 June 2020 through Jagjaguwar and Liberation.

It was nominated for Best Adult Contemporary Album at the 2020 ARIA Music Awards. At the AIR Awards of 2021, the album won Best Independent Pop Album or EP.

Three EPs were released following the album's launch, including two remix EPs, Extraordinary Life in October 2020 and Our Two Skins (Remixed) in January 2021, and a live EP, Refracted: Live at Phoenix Central Park in May 2021.

Singles
On 25 February 2020, the first single "Sandwiches" was released. The single is inspired by the loss of Payten's grandmother.

The second single "Aeroplane Bathroom", which was accompanied by the announcement of the new album, was released on 24 March 2020. In a press release, Payten explained the title of the single comes from how she felt "isolated" on an aeroplane and locked herself in the bathroom. The music video for the single, which was directed by Kasimir Burgess, was filmed at an abandoned Aircraft boneyard just outside Bangkok, Thailand.

On 6 May 2020, the third single "Volcanic" was released. The single was written in 2018 in Stockholm, and focuses on Payten struggling with her sexual identity and her parents requesting her to share it with her ailed grandmother. The music video for the single was filmed at her family farm in Canowindra, New South Wales.

"Unready", the fourth single, was released on 9 June 2020.

The fifth single "Extraordinary Life" was released on 23 June 2020, and was filmed in Bangkok at the same time of making "Aeroplane Bathroom". Payten explained the origins of the single: "I began recording the demo in stairwells across Europe while I was on tour with Asgeir and in most of the demo vocals you can hear distant chatter in Icelandic".

Critical reception
Our Two Skins was met with "generally favorable" reviews from critics. At Metacritic, which assigns a weighted average rating out of 100 to reviews from mainstream publications, this release received an average score of 79, based on 7 reviews.

Track listing

Personnel
Adapted from the album's liner notes.

Musicians
 Sophie Payten – writing, vocals, instruments 
 Zach Hanson – instruments 
 Dan Gee – writing 
 CJ Camereri – horn 
 Slow Moving Clouds – strings

Technical
 Sophie Payten – producing, mixing, engineering 
 Zach Hanson – producing, mixing, engineering 
 Chris Messina – producing, mixing, engineering 
 Catherine Marks – mixing 
 Alex Lahey – engineering 
 Heba Kadry – mastering

Artwork
 Jess Gleeson – photography
 Nathaniel David Utesch – art direction, design

Charts

References

2020 albums
Gordi (musician) albums
Jagjaguwar albums
Liberation Records albums